This is a list of air shows throughout the world.

Major air shows

Abbotsford International Airshow Canada's largest airshow
Aero India A biennial air show held in Bangalore, India, at the Yelahanka Air Force Station. It was first held in the year 1996 and since then has become one of the largest air shows in the world. In 2009 it had 592 exhibitors from over 25 countries. It is the largest air show in Asia.
Aerosport air show Created in 1993 at Igualada, the only Spanish airshow dedicated to corporate and sport aircraft
Africa Aerospace and Defence Aerospace and defence expo combined with an airshow, held every two years in South Africa. 
Air/Space America 88 (San Diego, California, U.S.)
Airbourne: Eastbourne International Airshow The world's biggest free seafront air show
Airdrie Regional Airshow (Airdrie, Alberta, Canada) - Now Wings Over Springbank Airshow (Springbank Airport, Calgary, AB)
AirPower(Military Airport Hinterstoisser, Zeltweg, Steiermark, Austria; Powered by the Austrian Army, Red Bull and the Gouverment of Steiermark)
Airshow LondonCanada's largest military airshow
AirShow San DiegoFormerly Wings over Gillespie Commemorative Air Force static airshow, El Cajon, California, U.S.
Antique Aircraft Fly-In and Airshow(Fredericksburg, Virginia, U.S.) This annual air show was discontinued in the early 1980s, with the last event taking place in 1983.
Asian AerospaceHeld in Singapore since its inception in 1981, until moving to Hong Kong in 2007
Australian International AirshowHeld every two years at Avalon Airport
Aviation Calgary Expo(Calgary, Alberta, Canada) Static airshow, with DC-3 flights
Aviation Nation(Nellis Air Force Base) Every November
Bethpage Air Show(Jones Beach State Park, New York, U.S.)
Boshears Skyfest(Augusta, Georgia U.S.)
Bournemouth Air Festival(United Kingdom)
CAF AirshowThe largest Warbird airshow is held by the Commemorative Air Force at its annual CAF Airshow in Midland, Texas, each October.
California International Airshow(Salinas, California, U.S.)
Canadian International Air Show(Toronto, Ontario, Canada)
Charleston Air Force Base Air Expo(Charleston Field, North Charleston, South Carolina, U.S.)
Chicago Air & Water Show(Chicago, Illinois, U.S.)
China International Aviation & Aerospace Exhibition(Zhuhai, Guangdong) The largest airshow in mainland China. It has been held in even years since 1996.
Classic Fighters(Blenheim, New Zealand)
Cleveland National Air Show(Cleveland, Ohio, U.S.)
Croatian International Airshow Varaždin(Varaždin, Croatia)
Culpeper Airfest(Culpeper, Virginia, U.S.) Dubbed "The Best Little Airshow in the East," this event is held normally on the second Saturday in October. The event features a massive warbird demonstration, made up of mostly of T-6 Texans, and more recently, a performance of the world's only civilian-owned Harrier.
Danish Air Show(Denmark)
Dubai Airshow(Dubai, United Arab Emirates) Held since 1989 each November on odd-numbered years, after every Paris Air Show
EAA AirVenture OshkoshOrganized by the Experimental Aircraft Association at Oshkosh, Wisconsin), it is famous for its crowded fly-in of visitors. The air show includes multiple displays as well as talks by influential people in aviation.
Farnborough AirshowThe world’s second largest airshow, after the Paris Airshow, takes place every even year at Farnborough Airport, in Hampshire.
La Ferté-Alais Air Show (Amicale Jean-Baptiste Salis)Famous for its vintage aircraft from WWII, WWI and the pionneer era.
FIDAE(Feria Internacional Del Aire y Del Espacio) Held since 1980 at Santiago, Chile. FIDAE takes place at Comodoro Arturo Merino Benitez International Airport in March every two years.
Fleet Week(various port cities, U.S.)
Flying Legends One of the premier Warbird air shows in Europe, until 2019, held at Duxford Aerodrome in Cambridgeshire, England on the second Sunday of July every year. Flying legends gathers together Warbirds from across Europe and America.
Fort Lauderdale Air Show (formerly Fort Lauderdale Air and Sea Show)Fort Lauderdale, Florida, US.
The Flying Circus(Bealeton, Virginia, U.S.) A weekly barnstorming airshow held on Sundays from May through October. Vintage biplane rides are also available.
Ghana Air ShowThe only air show  (light aviation) in West Africa is held in Ghana each year in November, hosted by WAASPS.
ILA Berlin Air Show(Internationale Luft- und Raumfahrtausstellung) (Berlin, Germany)
Ilopango Air Show(Ilopango International Airport, Ilopango, El Salvador)
Indonesia AirshowHeld in June 1986 at the Kemayoran airport and June 1996 at Soekarno-Hatta International airport
Internationale Luft- und Raumfahrtausstellung(ILA) (Berlin Air Show) is a large air and aerospace trade show, which, established in 1909, claims (along with Paris) to be the world's oldest.
Iran Kish Air Show(Kish, Iran)
Iruma Air Show(Iruma Air Base, Saitama Prefecture, Japan) Held annually on the November 3rd Culture Day holiday
Istanbul AirshowOrganized biannually at Istanbul Atatürk Airport since 1996, this is the single "Civil Only" aviation and airports exhibition in Eurasia.
Jersey International Air Display(Jersey)
Joint Base Andrews Air & Space Expo 2019(Joint Base Andrews)
Thessaloniki AirSea Show(Thessaloniki, Greece)
Kecskemét Air ShowOne of East Europe's biggest air shows, Kecskemét Air Show is held at Kecskemét, Hungary.
Langkawi International Maritime and Air Show(Langkawi, Malaysia) Held at Langkawi Island, Malaysia, on odd-numbered years since 1991

MAKS The biggest air show and aerospace trade show in Russia, MAK, is an international air show held near Moscow on Zhukovskiy LII air field. The first show, Mosaeroshow-92, was held in 1992. Since 1993, it was renamed to its current name and is held on odd years.
Malta International Airshow (Luqa, Malta)
Martinique Air Show (Martinique, French West Indies)
Miramar Air Show There are several annual air shows in the United States that display a variety of modern military aircraft, including the Miramar Air Show every October.
Northwest EAA Fly-In (Arlington, Washington, U.S.)
Oregon International Air Show (Hillsboro, Oregon, U.S.)
Pacific Airshow (Formally The Great Pacific Airshow, Formally The Breitling Huntington Beach Airshow) Annual air show held over the beachfront in Huntington Beach, California.  The show which includes many big name military and civilian performers, regularly draws over one million spectators over the three day event. 
Paris Air Show (Le Bourget Air Show) (France) Claims (along with Berlin) to be the world's oldest. Established in 1909 and attracting approximately 400,000 visitors, it is held in June on odd-numbered years, alternating with the British Farnborough Airshow held in July on even-numbered years.
Quad City Airshow (Davenport, Iowa), U.S.)
Radom Air Show (Radom, Poland)
RAFA Shoreham Airshow (Shoreham, West Sussex, England, United Kingdom)

Redhill Airshow(Redhill, Surrey, England, United Kingdom)
Reno Air RacesAlso known as the National Championship Air Races, this takes place annually in September at the Reno Stead Airport a few miles north of Reno, Nevada. It includes several days of qualifying followed by four and a half days of multi-aircraft heat racing culminating in the Unlimited Class Gold Race on Sunday afternoon. The event also features civil airshow acts and military flight demonstrations between races, plus vendor areas and a large civil and military static aircraft display.
Roskilde Airshow (Roskilde Airport, Roskilde, Denmark)
Rotorfest (Brandywine Airport, West Chester, Pennsylvania, U.S.) All helicopter air show 
Royal International Air Tattoo The world's largest military air show is the Royal International Air Tattoo at RAF Fairford, United Kingdom. The RIAT gathers military aircraft and military display teams from all over the world.
Royal Netherlands Air Force Open days (various military airports in the Netherlands)
Seafair (Seattle, Washington, U.S.)
Seething Airfield Charity Airday (Seething, Norfolk, England, United Kingdom)
Selfridge Air National Guard Base (Detroit, Michigan, U.S.)
Serbian Air Show (Batajnica Air Base, Belgrade, Serbia)
Singapore Airshow Held in February on even-numbered years at the Changi Exhibition Centre, which was the source of the dispute between Asian Aerospace organisers
Selangor Aviation Show Dedicated for the business and general aviation and helicopters, Selangor Aviation Show will be a regional networking platform for industry players in showcasing the future of aviation and aerospace industry.
SHG Airshow(Sivrihisar, Turkey) Held in September at Sivrihisar Aviation Center since 2015 
Southport Airshow (Southport, England) The largest air show in the north west of England
Sun 'n Fun The annual Sun 'n Fun air show in Lakeland, Florida is an independent corporation, famous for its crowded fly-in of visitors and usually held in the second or third week of April.
Sunderland International Airshow(Seaburn, Sunderland, England, United Kingdom) Europe's largest free annual air show. Takes place over Roker and Seaburn sea front . It takes place over the course of three days each July.
Stuart Air Show (formerly VNA Air Show)Stuart, Florida, United States.  It takes place every November at Witham Field
Tannkosh The closest European equivalent to Oshkosh is Tannkosh, held annually at Tannheim airfield in Germany. 
Thunder over the Boardwalk (Atlantic City, New Jersey, U.S.)
Thunder Over Louisville (Louisville, Kentucky, U.S.)
Thunder Over Michigan

(Ypslianti, Michigan, U.S.) Held annually at historic Willow Run Airport, in Belleville, Michigan.
Tico Warbird Airshow (Titusville, Florida, U.S.)
Vectren Dayton Air Show (Dayton, Ohio, U.S.)
Volkel in de Wolken Hamilton Airshow (Volkel Air Base, Netherlands)
Waddington International Air Show The Royal Air Force's largest air show is held annually at RAF Waddington, United Kingdom. The airshow features participants from across the world and showcases the work of the RAF and its allies.
Warbirds over Wanaka (Wanaka, New Zealand) A military oriented show is held every two years in Wanaka, New Zealand.
Windsor International Air Show (Windsor, Ontario, Canada)
Wings and Wheels (Dunsfold Park, Surrey, England, United Kingdom)
Wings Over Springbank Airshow
Wings Over Houston (Ellington Airport, Houston, Texas, U.S.)
Wings over Pittsburgh (Pittsburgh International Airport, Pittsburgh, Pennsylvania, U.S.)
[Wings Over Wayne] (Seymour Johnson Air Force Base, Goldsboro, North Carolina, U.S.)
Wings Over Illawarra (Shellharbour Airport, Albion Park Rail, 2527, NSW, Australia)

Historic air shows
1909: The "Internationale Luftschiffahrt-Ausstellung" was first held in Frankfurt am Main, Germany, from July 10 to October 17, 1909, later becoming the Internationale Luft- und Raumfahrtausstellung (ILA) and as such can lay claim to being the oldest aviation show in the world.
1909: Grande Semaine d'Aviation de la Champagne at Reims in France in August 1909. Attended by most of the important aviators of the time, including Glenn Curtiss, who won the Gordon Bennett Trophy competition. This show inspired John Moisant.
1910: Los Angeles International Air Meet at Dominguez Field from January 10 to January 20, 1910. Participants included Glenn Curtiss, Charles Hamilton, Lincoln Beachey and Louis Paulhan. The Los Angeles Times called it "one of the greatest public events in the history of the West."
1910: Harvard-Boston Aero Meet at the Harvard Aviation Field in Atlantic, Massachusetts, from September 3 to September 13, 1910. It was the first major air event in the eastern United States and offered $90,000 in prizes and appearance fees. Participants included the Wright brothers, the Glenn Curtiss exhibition teams and Claude Grahame-White. This show inspired Harriet Quimby to become the first female pilot in the United States.
1910: Belmont International Aviation Tournament offered approximately $75,000 in prize money. Participants included Count Jacques de Lesseps, Roland Garros, Claude Grahame-White, Glenn Curtiss, John Moisant, Arch Hoxsey, Ralph Johnstone and Charles Hamilton.
1925–1931: Ford National Reliability Air Tour offered the Edsel B. Ford Trophy; it was inscribed, "This trophy is offered to encourage the up-building of commercial aviation as a medium of transportation."
1945-1950: The "Thrasher Brothers Aerial Circus" featuring the Twin Ercoupe and the "World's Smallest Airport", was born after World War II when the oldest brother, Grady Thrasher, purchased some surplus planes — Piper Cubs, a Stearman biplane and two Ercoupes — from the U.S. Army for $200 to $500 each and a new 1946 Ford car. The three brothers performed aerial stunts, including one in which Bud Thrasher stood on top of the plane as it coursed the skies. Their most popular stunt was landing a plane on a wooden platform on top of a moving car, then taking off again.
1977: Golden Wings over Richmond (October 15–16, 1977), Richmond, Virginia, U.S. This mega air event commemorated the 50th anniversary (1927-1977) of both Charles Lindbergh's historic flight from New York to Paris and of Richmond International Airport (then known as Byrd International Airport). Festivities included a World War I dogfighting reenactment, a chronological fly-in of various historical aircraft from the 1900s up to the present day, performances of top aerobatic acts of the day; and a flight demonstration of the Concorde, which marked the aircraft's only visit to Richmond. A severe thunderstorm shortened the October 16th show.

See also 
 Hot air balloon festival
 List of air show accidents and incidents
 List of air shows in Australia
 List of air shows in Japan
List of air shows in Baltimore

References 

Air s
Lists of festivals by topic